Rwira is an agricultural village in the Commune of Rutovu in Bururi Province in southern Burundi. It lies to the west of Rutovu. It is a place known for its bean production.

References 

Populated places in Bururi Province